The 1905 Copa del Rey Final was the third final of the Copa del Rey, the Spanish football cup competition. The match took place on 18 April 1905 at the Hipódromo, Madrid. The match was contested by Athletic Bilbao and Madrid FC. Madrid was awarded the trophy for the first time after defeating Athletic Bilbao 1–0 with Manuel Prast netting the only goal of the match.

Match details

See also
El Viejo Clásico

References

Copa
Copa del Rey Finals
Copa Del Rey Final 1905
Copa Del Rey Final 1905